Miamitown is a census-designated place (CDP) in western Whitewater Township, Hamilton County, Ohio, United States. The population was 1,256 at the 2020 census. It has a post office with the ZIP code 45041.

History
Miamitown was founded in 1816 by Arthur Henry, who operated a flour mill and distillery. The community was named after the nearby Great Miami River.

Geography
It is situated on the west bank of the Great Miami River at the intersection of Harrison Pike and Ohio State Route 128 (Hamilton Cleves Pike Road). Interstate 74 runs along the southern edge of the village, with access to it via Exit 7.

References

External links 
 NTSB

Census-designated places in Hamilton County, Ohio
Census-designated places in Ohio
1816 establishments in Ohio